The Tenther movement is a social movement in the United States, whose adherents espouse the political ideology that the federal government's enumerated powers must be read very narrowly to exclude much of what the federal government already does, citing the Tenth Amendment to the United States Constitution in support of this. The text of the amendment reads:

Despite the movement's assertions, the Supreme Court has interpreted the Tenth Amendment such that the Amendment does not require a narrow interpretation of the federal government's enumerated powers. Instead, the Court holds that the powers of the federal government derive from the states voluntarily surrendering part of their sovereign powers. This view was reiterated in United States v. Darby Lumber in which the Court stated that the Tenth Amendment "states but a truism that all [powers of the State Sovereign] is retained which has not been surrendered [by ratification of the Constitution and membership in the United States]". In summary, members of the Tenther Movement believe that the Tenth Amendment should be interpreted as requiring that the federal government's enumerated powers be construed narrowly. In contrast, the Supreme Court interprets the Tenth Amendment as a default rule. In the absence of enumerated federal power, each state is the supreme sovereign of its own territory, but that this rule has no bearing on interpreting the scope of an enumerated federal power (e.g. the power to make uniform bankruptcy law).

Political and social positions 
Tenthers oppose a broad range of federal government programs, including the war on drugs, federal surveillance and other limitations on privacy and civil and economic liberties, plus numerous New Deal legislation to Great Society legislation such as Medicaid, Medicare, the VA health system and the G.I. Bill.

Comparison with other movements

Libertarianism 
The Tenther movement is distinct from libertarianism, although adherents of the two philosophies often have similar positions. Whereas libertarians oppose programs such as the war on drugs on ideological grounds, seeing them as unjustified government intrusion into lives of its citizens, Tenthers hold that such programs may be perfectly acceptable, but only when implemented by individual states.

States' rights 
Tenthers argue for the recognition of limited sovereignty of the states. Opponents use the term in order to draw parallels between adherents and 19th century states' rights secessionists as well as the movement to resist federal civil rights legislation. Tentherism was also one of the justifications cited by pro-slavery advocate John Calhoun before the Civil War.

Media appearances 
Joni Ernst, a Republican Senator since 2015, said in a September 2013 forum held by the Iowa Faith and Freedom Coalition while she was a member of the Iowa Senate that Congress should not bother to pass laws "that the states would consider nullifying", referring to what she describes as "200-plus years of federal legislators going against the Tenth Amendment's states' rights". Ernst's statements were criticized in an article published by the United Press International on the grounds that they were based upon a misunderstanding of Tenth Amendment case law.

In a weblog post for Reason, journalist Radley Balko objected to the name Tenther as the term originated as a pejorative used by those opposed to the movement's ideas in an attempt to reference and draw parallels to conspiratorial movements such as Birthers and Truthers.''

Bills against mass surveillance 

In 2013 and 2014, the group successfully introduced bills in state legislatures based on the model act the Fourth Amendment Protection Act. The intent of the bills was to prevent state governments from co-operating with the National Security Agency's mass surveillance projects, by forbidding state universities from doing NSA research or from hosting NSA recruiters, or preventing the provision of water to NSA facilities. Bills were introduced in Kansas, Missouri, Oklahoma, California, Utah, Washington, and Arizona.

See also 

 Constitutionalism
 Interposition
 Nullification (U.S. Constitution)
 Posse Comitatus (organization)
 Sovereign citizen movement

References

External links 
 Tenth Amendment Center

Far-right politics in the United States
Federalism in the United States
Political movements in the United States
Sovereign citizen movement
Law of the United States